Songs I'll Always Sing is a two-record compilation album by American country music singer and songwriter Merle Haggard and The Strangers, released in 1977. It reached #15 in the US Country Charts. The album collects many of Haggard's best known recordings during his successful run at the label, including nine of his twenty-four #1 hits dating back to 1966.

Critical reception

AllMusic critic Stephen Thomas Erlewine wrote in his review: "Though many compilations have followed it since it was first released in 1976, Songs I'll Always Sing remains one of the definitive Merle Haggard compilations. Relying not only on hit singles, the 20-track double-album set features a number of album tracks and obscurities - such as 'Love and Honor,' 'Silver Wings,' 'Honky Tonk Night Time Man,' 'Things Aren't Funny Anymore,' and 'I Forget You Every Day' - which give a more rounded and accurate picture of Hag's classic Capitol recordings."

Track listing
All songs by Merle Haggard unless otherwise noted.

Side 1
"Okie from Muskogee" (Merle Haggard, Eddie Burris) – 2:53 - 1969 #1
"The Emptiest Arms in the World" – 2:50 - 1973
"Mama Tried" – 2:10 - 1968 #1
"Swinging Doors" –  2:51 - 1966
"Uncle Lem" (Glenn Martin) – 2:54 - 1974

Side 2
"The Fightin' Side of Me" – 2:48 - 1970 #1
"Sing Me Back Home" – 2:45 - 1968 #1
"Silver Wings" – 2:53 - 1968
"Sing a Sad Song" (Wynn Stewart) – 2:30 - 1963
"Honky Tonk Night Time Man" – 2:38 - 1974

Side 3
"Kentucky Gambler" (Dolly Parton) – 2:39 - 1974 #1
"I'm a Lonesome Fugitive" (Liz Anderson, Casey Anderson) – 2:55 - 1967 #1
"Things Aren't Funny Anymore" – 2:40 - 1974 #1
"Daddy Frank (The Guitar Man)" – 3:10 - 1971 #1
"I Forget You Every Day" – 2:52 - 1973

Side 4
"Workin' Man Blues" – 2:33 - 1969 #1
"Love and Honor" – 2:47 - 1974
"Branded Man" – 3:04 - 1967
"Someday We'll Look Back" – 2:28 - 1971
"I Take a Lot of Pride in What I Am" – 2:47 - 1968

Personnel
 Merle Haggard – vocals, guitar

The Strangers:
 Roy Nichols – lead guitar
 Norman Hamlet – steel guitar
 Tiny Moore – mandolin, fiddle
 Eldon Shamblin– guitar
 Ralph Mooney – steel guitar
 Gene Price – bass
 Gordon Terry - fiddle
 Ronnie Reno – guitar
 Bobby Wayne – guitar
 Marcia Nichols – guitar
 Clint Strong – guitar
 Mark Yeary – piano
 George French – piano
 Dennis Hromek – bass
 James Tittle – bass
 Johnny Meeks - bass
 Jerry Ward – bass
 Wayne Durham – bass
 Biff Adam – drums
 Eddie Burris – drums
 Don Markham – saxophone
 Jimmy Belkin – fiddle
 Gary Church – horns

Production
Produced by Ken Nelson & Fuzzy Owen

References

1977 compilation albums
Merle Haggard compilation albums
Capitol Records compilation albums
Albums produced by Ken Nelson (United States record producer)